Apistogramma nijsseni is a species of cichlid fish, endemic to highly restricted local black water habitats in the Quebrada Carahuayte, a small stream in the Ucayali River drainage, southern Peru. Apistogramma brooding females assume a bright yellow and black aposematic coloring: in A. nijsseni, unusually, a healthy, unstressed female retains this coloring. The species is popular aquarium fish amongst dwarf cichlid hobbyists, though it does not often appear in the general pet fish market.

The species is named after the Dutch ichthyologist Han Nijssen

See also
List of freshwater aquarium fish species

References 
 

nijsseni
Freshwater fish of Peru
Fishkeeping
Fish described in 1979
Taxa named by Sven O. Kullander